Jennifer Wenth (born 24 July 1991 in Vienna) is an Austrian athlete specialising in the middle- and long-distance running events. She represented her country at one outdoor and two indoor European Championships.

She is the current national record holder in the indoor 5000 metres.

Competition record

Personal bests
Outdoor
1000 metres – 2:44.89 (Pliezhausen 2010)
1500 metres – 4:11.07 (Ghent 2011)
3000 metres – 9:09.20 (Moncton 2010)
5000 metres – 15:45.50 (Huelva 2014)
Indoor
1500 metres – 4:16.25 (Ghent 2011)
3000 metres – 8:59.84 (Prague 2015)
5000 metres – 15:43.88 (Stockholm 2015)

References

1991 births
Living people
Austrian female middle-distance runners
Austrian female long-distance runners
Athletes from Vienna
World Athletics Championships athletes for Austria
European Games gold medalists for Austria
Athletes (track and field) at the 2015 European Games
European Games medalists in athletics
Athletes (track and field) at the 2016 Summer Olympics
Olympic athletes of Austria